The NSB (Norwegian State Railways) Class IV (as in the number four, or "fire" in Norwegian) or Tryggve Class was a class of  narrow gauge  steam locomotives built by Beyer, Peacock & Company in Manchester, England. The  gauge Beyer Peacock locomotives built for the Isle of Man Railway strongly resemble this design.

Further reading 

Bjerke, Thor; Hansen, Trond B.; Johansson, Erik W.; Sando, Svein E. (1987). Damplokomotiver i Norge. Norsk Jernbaneklubb. s. 222–224, 232–233. .

Steam locomotives of Norway
Beyer, Peacock locomotives
2-4-0T locomotives
3 ft 6 in gauge locomotives